Same Oul' Town is the third studio album by Irish rock band The Saw Doctors. The CD was released on The Saw Doctors' own record label, Shamtown Records and has the catalogue number of SAWDOC004CD.

Track listing
"All The One"
"Same Oul Town"
"To Win Just Once"
"Everyday"
"World Of Good"
"Back To Tuam"
"Mercy Gates"
"Macnas Parade"
"Share The Darkness"
"I Want You More"
"All Over Now"
"Clare Island"

Personnel

Band
Davy Carton: Vocals, Guitar
Leo Moran: Guitar, Backing Vocals
John Donnelly Drums, Percussion, Vocals
Pearse Doherty: Bass guitar, Vocals, Whistle
Derek Murray: Keyboards, Accordion, Guitar, Mandolin, Banjo

Guest musicians
Joe Bernie: Saxophone
Pat Short: Saxophone
Jim Higgins: Piano
Anthony Thistlethwaite: Mandolin
Peter Ray : Vocals
Brid Dooley: Vocals
Padraig Stevens: Percussion
John Moran: Finger Clicks
Michael Hegarty: Electric Triangle

External links
The Saw Doctors Official Website

The Saw Doctors albums
1996 albums